Gara Choqa (also Romanized as Garā Choqā, Garā Cheqā, and Garachoqā; also known as Gara Chegha) is a village in Hegmataneh Rural District, in the Central District of Hamadan County, Hamadan Province, Iran. At the 2006 census, its population was 2,252, in 561 families.

References 

Populated places in Hamadan County